Simeon Strunsky (July 23, 1879 – February 5, 1948) was a Russian-born Jewish American essayist and editorialist. He is best remembered as a prominent editorialist for the New York Times for more than two decades.

Biography

Early years

Simeon Strunsky was born July 23, 1879 in Vitsebsk, Belorussia, then part of the Russian Empire and today part of Belarus. His parents were Isidor S. and Perl Wainstein. He graduated from Columbia University, where he was a member of the Philolexian Society, in 1900.

Career

Strunsky was a department editor of the New International Encyclopedia from 1900 to 1906, editorial writer on the New York Evening Post from 1906 to 1913, and subsequently was literary editor of that paper until 1920.

Strunsky's  columns also appeared in Atlantic Monthly, Bookman, Collier's, and Harper's Weekly. He wrote:

 Through the Outlooking Glass with Theodore Roosevelt (1912)  
 The Patient Observer (1911)  
 Belshazzar Court, or Village Life in New York City (1914):  "The simplicity and kindliness of human nature...in the complexities of the modern city".
 Post-Impressions (1914)  
 Little Journeys Towards Paris. By W. Hohenzollern.  (1918)

Strunsky joined the New York Times in 1924 and was on staff until his death in Princeton, New Jersey after three months of hospitalization. He was married to Socialist activist and historian Manya Gordon; they had a son and a daughter. He had a son, Robert Strunsky, by his first wife, Rebecca Slobodkin (d. 1906).

Strunsky's most notable contributions to the Times were his editorial-page essays titled "Topics of the Times." Although it now competes with such departments as "Editorial Observer" and is infrequently seen nowadays, "Topics of the Times" remains a popular feature of the paper.

Death and legacy

Simeon Strunsky died on February 5, 1948, aged 68.

Books

 " Sinbad And His Friends." Henry Holt And Company, 1921. 
 King Akhnaton. Longmans, Green & Co., 1928.
 "No Mean City" E.P.Dutton and Company Inc., 1944

Footnotes

External links
 
 
 

1879 births
1948 deaths
Emigrants from the Russian Empire to the United States
American people of Russian-Jewish descent
Columbia College (New York) alumni
American essayists
American satirists
Journalists from New York City
Members of the American Academy of Arts and Letters